Volcán Isluga National Park is located in the Andes, in the Tarapacá Region of Chile, near Colchane and south of Lauca Biosphere Reserve. It covers 1,747 square kilometers, with elevations ranging between 2,100 and 5,550 meters.  It is named after Volcán Isluga, which at 5,550 m, is the tallest mountain in this park.

Peaks
There are numerous peaks in the national park. The most prominent include the Qinsachata Hill (5400 m.a.s.l), Tatajachura Hill (5252 m.a.s.l.), the Isluga Volcano (5218 m.a.s.l.) and the Catarama (5207 m.a.s.l.).

Flora
The park has the usual flora that grows at high altitudes. Numerous species of cacti and queñoas are native to the park.

The park includes cultural heritage of the Aymara people. There are several ceremonial towns within the park, such as Isluga.

References

 Parque Nacional Volcán Isluga

Protected areas established in 1967
Protected areas of Tarapacá Region
National parks of Chile